Lukachukai is a census-designated place (CDP) in Apache County, Arizona, United States.  The population was 1,701 at the 2010 census. It is within the Navajo Nation.

Geography
Lukachukai, a Navajo word translated as "a field of white reeds", is located at  (36.418478, -109.236487).

Climate
According to the Köppen Climate Classification system, Lukachukai has a semi-arid climate, abbreviated "BSk" on climate maps.

Demographics

As of the census of 2000, there were 1,565 people, 423 households, and 326 families living in the CDP. The racial makeup of the CDP was 98.2% Native American, 1.2% White, 0.1% Asian, 0.3% from other races, and 0.3% from two or more races.  1.0% of the population were Hispanic or Latino of any race.

There were 423 households, out of which 44.9% had children under the age of 18 living with them, 48.2% were married couples living together, 22.7% had a female householder with no husband present, and 22.9% were non-families. 21.3% of all households were made up of individuals, and 7.8% had someone living alone who was 65 years of age or older.  The average household size was 3.70 and the average family size was 4.41.

In the CDP, the age distribution of the population shows 41.1% under the age of 18, 10.7% from 18 to 24, 24.4% from 25 to 44, 16.4% from 45 to 64, and 7.5% who were 65 years of age or older.  The median age was 24 years. For every 100 females, there were 94.9 males.  For every 100 females age 18 and over, there were 96.6 males.

The median income for a household in the CDP was $10,179, and the median income for a family was $11,250. Males had a median income of $17,604 versus $15,893 for females. The per capita income for the CDP was $3,380.  About 65.0% of families and 61.9% of the population were below the poverty line, including 61.9% of those under age 18 and 49.3% of those age 65 or over.

Education
Lukachukai is a part of the Chinle Unified School District in the Navajo Nation. Lukachukai is zoned to Tsaile Public School (K-8) and Chinle High   School.

See also

 List of census-designated places in Arizona

References

External links

Census-designated places in Apache County, Arizona
Populated places on the Navajo Nation